Mykola Liubynsky  (5 October 1891 in Khmelnytskyi Oblast – d. 8 January 1938 in Sandarmokh) was a Ukrainian politician and diplomat. Minister of Foreign Affairs of Ukrainian National Republic (1918). He was a member of the Ukrainian delegation at the Brest-Litovsk Peace Treaty.

Education 
Mykola Liubynsky graduated from the Faculty of Philology of the University of Kyiv (1916).

Professional career and experience 

In April 1917 - he was a member of the Ukrainian Central Rada and the Lesser Rada. Later he headed the Ukrainian Socialist-Revolutionary Party.

From December 1917 to February 1918 - he was a participant in the Brest-Litovsk Peace Treaty, where he signed on behalf of the Ukrainian delegation the Appeal to Germany about the need to provide military aid to the Ukrainian National Republic.

In March–April 1918 - he was a member of the Vsevolod Holubovych government.

From March 3, 1918 - April 28, 1918 - Minister of Foreign Affairs of Ukraine

In 1920s - he lived in Kyiv, was a research associate at the Institute of the Ukrainian Scientific Language and co-editor of the Bulletin of the Institute of the Ukrainian Scientific Language.

In 1930 - he was sentenced to three years’ imprisonment and five years of internal exile.

November 12, 1937 - He was arrested.

December 15, 1937 - Sentenced to the highest degree of punishment, by a special troika of the Leningrad Regional NKVD Directorate.

January 8, 1938 - he was executed by firing squad in Sandarmokh, Karelia.

Liubynsky was partially rehabilitated in 1989.

References

External links 
 Shot at Sandarmokh. The Ukrainians’ northern Golgotha
 Brest-Litovsk, Peace Treaty of
 Historical Dictionary of Ukraine
 Commemorating the Treaty of Brest-Litovsk
 The Fourth Universal and Its Ideological Antecedents

1891 births
1938 deaths
Foreign ministers of Ukraine
People from Khmelnytskyi Oblast
Taras Shevchenko National University of Kyiv alumni
Russian Constituent Assembly members
Members of the Central Council of Ukraine
Gulag detainees
Ukrainian people executed by the Soviet Union
Executed Ukrainian people
Soviet rehabilitations